Brandon Trust is a United Kingdom charitable organization working with and for people with learning disabilities. They focus on helping people with said disabilities to live life how they want to.

Brandon Trust works throughout the South West of England and in London, supporting approximately 1,600 people with learning disabilities and autism.

It has more than 2,000 employees and its registered head office is in Patchway, Bristol.

Brandon Trust is licensed to provide services by the Care Quality Commission. It provides personalized services designed around individual needs, from living solutions to vocational courses, from community and leisure access to employment training and support.

Brandon Trust is a member of the Voluntary Organisations Disability Group. Former chief executive, Lucy Hurst-Brown, was a regular contributor to national articles relating to social care and learning disabilities.

History
Brandon Trust was formed in 1994 by the merger of the Buttress Trust with the South Avon Housing Association. In April 2000, Spectrum Day Services, previously part of the NHS, was transferred to Brandon Trust.  Six years later the charity secured an innovative contract with the Gloucestershire Partnership.  The following year, in 2007, Brandon began work in Cornwall, supporting over 90 adults with learning disabilities, all brokered on individual budgets. Its London operations started in November 2012 as part of a full merger with not-for-profit organisation Odyssey Care.

In August 2015, Brandon Trust opened its first charity shop in Bristol at 2 Cotham Hill with the promise of offering shoppers a different experience from other charity outlets in the area. Since then, three more shops have opened in Bristol and the charity is also involved in running several social enterprises including a care farm, pottery, ceramics studios, and several cafes.

From September 2015, Brandon Trust began providing community day support services to adults with learning disabilities and autism in Warwickshire. It followed a Warwickshire County Council tendering process in which Brandon Trust was successfully awarded the contract to run the Sesame Centre in Rugby and the Ramsden Centre in Nuneaton.

In December 2015, Yate-based charity Children's Playlink, transferred its South Gloucestershire services to Brandon Trust, including holiday play and buddy schemes.

Then, in April 2016, Brandon Trust started providing supported living services to more than 70 adults with learning disabilities and autism, across 18 locations in Oxfordshire. It provides services in Banbury, Bicester, Oxford City, Hook Norton, Chipping Norton, and Chalgrove.

Publications
Brandon Trust's 20th anniversary report Finding Freedom launched at the Learning Disability Today London conference on 27 November 2014, warns that the vast majority of people with learning disabilities remain invisible in our society despite more than 20 years of 'care in the community.' Research commissioned by the charity found that 64% of people surveyed said people with learning disabilities were not visible in communities. This is despite an estimated 1.5 million people with learning disabilities living in the UK. Of those who do know someone with a learning disability, just a quarter said they would describe that person as a friend.
Drawing on her experience of three decades working in the disability sector, former Brandon Trust CEO, Lucy Hurst-Brown, was invited to speak to Radio 4's Four Thought programme during the 2016 Hay Festival where she debated the issue of people with learning disabilities being 'invisible' and 'lonely citizens' in society, with little or no voice.
The script was broadcast on BBC Radio 4's Four Thought programme on 29 June, and has attracted much feedback within the social care sector. The full podcast is on the BBC website.

References

Charities for disabled people based in the United Kingdom
Charities based in Bristol
1994 establishments in the United Kingdom
Organizations established in 1994